Castle Face Records is an American independent record label, founded in 2006 by John Dwyer, Matt Jones and Brian Lee Hughes.

The label was initially formed to release Sucks Blood, the sixth studio album by Dwyer's band, Thee Oh Sees.

Artists
Apprentice Destroyer
Burnt Ones
Coachwhips (reissues)
Damaged Bug 
Dan Melchior
The Fresh & Onlys
Kelley Stoltz
King Gizzard & the Lizard Wizard
Male Gaze
Mr Elevator
OBN III'S
ORB
POW!
Prettiest Eyes
Sunwatchers
Thee Oh Sees
The I.L.Y's
Ty Segall
Useless Eaters
White Fence
Zig-Zags

References

Alternative rock record labels
American independent record labels
Garage rock record labels
Indie rock record labels
Record labels established in 2006